Hint to Husbands is an 1806 comedy play by the British dramatist Richard Cumberland which was first performed at Covent Garden Theatre. The play was not a success and lasted for only five nights.

References

Bibliography
 Mudford, William. The Life of Richard Cumberland. Sherwood, Neely & Jones, 1812.

Plays by Richard Cumberland
1806 plays